André-Dieudonné Kolingba (12 August 1936 – 7 February 2010) was a Central African politician, who was the fourth President of the Central African Republic (CAR), from 1 September 1981 until 1 October 1993. He took power from President David Dacko in a bloodless coup d'état in 1981 and lost power to Ange-Félix Patassé in a democratic election held in 1993. Kolingba retained the strong support of France until the end of the Cold War in 1992, after which both internal and external pressure forced him to hold presidential elections which he lost.

His twelve-year term in office saw the growing influence of the International Monetary Fund (IMF) and World Bank in decisions by donor-nations regarding financial support and management of the Central African state. Many members of Kolingba's ethnic group, the Yakoma people, obtained lucrative posts in the public, private and parastatal sectors of the CAR's economy during his era. This gave rise to growing tension between so-called  "southerners" (including the riverine Yakoma) and "northerners" (including the savanna Gbaya) in the CAR which led to violent confrontations between these groups during the Patassé era (1993–2003).

Biography

Early life and education
André-Dieudonné Kolingba was born on 12 August 1936 in Bangui, the capital of the French colony of Oubangui-Chari in French Equatorial Africa. A member of the riverine Yakoma ethnic group, Kolingba (meaning "male Buffalo") joined the French military in 1954 and was transferred to the Central African army at independence in 1960. He became a sub-lieutenant on 1 October 1964, a colonel, and then a brigadier general on 3 April 1973. As a battalion commander, he was named technical adviser to the minister of national defense, veterans and war victims on 1 March 1977, as well as aide-de-camp of Bokassa. He then served briefly as the CAR's ambassador to Canada — replacing Sylvestre Bangui — and the Federal Republic of Germany before being named minister in March 1979. When Bokassa was overthrown in 1979 and David Dacko was restored to power by the French, general Kolingba gained Dacko's favor and was made army chief of staff in July 1981.

Overthrow of David Dacko
In September 1981, general Kolingba overthrew Dacko in the 1981 Central African Republic coup d'état. There has been considerable speculation about who supported Kolingba's seizure of power. It has been suggested that local French military advisers helped him carry out the coup without the authorization or knowledge of Socialist President François Mitterrand and his entourage (Delayan 1985; Kalck 2004). The French supported Kolingba until the fall of the Berlin Wall and the democratization movement in Africa during the late 1980s and early 1990s led to local, French and international pressure to hold presidential elections.

Ruling years
After overthrowing Dacko in 1981, Kolingba established a military committee for national reconstruction to rule the country, but in fact he ruled as a military dictator, more corrupt than brutal, until 1986, when he submitted a Constitution to a national referendum. The document was approved with an implausible total of 92 percent. Under its terms, Kolingba was automatically elected president for a six-year term. It also established the Central African Democratic Rally (Rassemblement Démocratique Centrafricain, RDC) as the country's only legal party. Parliamentary elections were held in 1987, in which voters were presented with a single list of RDC candidates. With all candidates effectively handpicked by Kolingba, he effectively held complete political control over the country.

The end of the Cold War in 1992 made Western nations less willing to tolerate anti-communist Third World dictatorships.  Internal and external pressures eventually forced Kolingba to open up the regime. In March 1991 he agreed to share power with Edouard Frank, who he named prime minister. He also established a commission to make the constitution more democratic and pluralistic. In late 1991, the donor community (most notably a very vocal US ambassador) finally pressured Kolingba to hold free elections. These took place in 1992, assisted by the UN Electoral Assistance Unit and monitored by international observers. Kolingba finished dead last, with only 10 percent of the vote. In response, he had the constitutional council declare the election invalid. His presidential mandate was due to expire on 28 November 1992, but he carried out a "constitutional coup d'état" which extended his presidential term for another 90 days.

Election of Patassé
On 3 February 1993, Kolingba established an interim organ, the National Provisional Political Council of the Republic (Conseil National Politique Provisoire de la République). On 28 February 1993, Abel Goumba, leader of the opposition Democratic Forces for Dialogue (Concertation des Forces Démocratiques), announced President Kolingba was no longer president. Unwilling to give in, Kolingba remained in his post but the group of local donor representatives (GIBAFOR), notably from the USA and France, forced him to hold proper elections. The same team which the UN Electoral Assistance unit had provided for the earlier election, and which Kolingba's government caused to fail, was brought in to give its support. Kolingba came in fourth, with only 12 percent of the vote - well short of a spot in the runoff.  Angé Patassé won the presidency in the second round on 19 September 1993.  When Kolingba turned over the presidency to Patassé a month later, it marked the first - and to date - only time since independence when an incumbent president peacefully surrendered power to the opposition.

Attempted coup
On 28 May 2001, the 2001 Central African Republic coup d'état attempt against President Patassé but it failed. Patassé accused Kolingba and his partisans of attempting to destabilize his regime and wanted to put him on trial and so Kolingba took refuge in Uganda. Patassé was overthrown in the 2003 Central African Republic coup d'état by François Bozizé, who declared an amnesty for all those involved in the attempted coup d'état of 2001. Kolingba finally returned to Bangui on 5 October 2003 during the last days of a National Conference (Dialogue National) which Bozizé sponsored to promote reconciliation and reconstruction of the country. On 7 October 2003 Kolingba attended the conference and spoke to the delegates, publicly asking for forgiveness for the excesses committed during his rule. He then left for Paris on 2 November 2003 for a prostate operation. Kolingba died in Paris on 7 February 2010.

Awards and family
Kolingba was named officier de l'Ordre de l'Opération Bokassa (Officer of the Order of the Operation Bokassa) on 1 December 1971, officier de l'Ordre de la Médaille de la Reconnaissance Centrafricaine (Officer of the Order of the Medal of Central African Gratitude) on 1 January 1972, chevalier de l'Ordre du Merite Postal (Knight of the Order of Postal Merit) on 1 December 1972, commandeur (Commander) (1 January 1975) and dignité de Grand-Croix (Grand Cross) (1 December 1981) de l'Ordre du Mérite Centrafricain (Central African Order of Merit).

References

Sources

Delayen, Julie Anne. "Origins and Causes of Military Rule in the Central African Republic." M.A. thesis, University of Florida, 1985.

1936 births
2010 deaths
People from Bangui
French military personnel
People of French Equatorial Africa
Heads of state of the Central African Republic
Central African Republic exiles
Leaders who took power by coup
Central African Republic military personnel
Central African Democratic Rally politicians
Ambassadors of the Central African Republic to Canada
Ambassadors of the Central African Republic to West Germany
1980s in the Central African Republic
1990s in the Central African Republic